Larutia nubisilvicola is a species of skink endemic to Southern Thailand. It is only known from its type locality in Khao Nan National Park in the Nakhon Si Thammarat Province. It occurs on the forest floor, close to the trunks of the larger trees that it uses as refugia.

References

nubisilvicola
Lizards of Asia
Reptiles of Thailand
Endemic fauna of Thailand
Reptiles described in 2011
Taxa named by Tanya Chan-ard
Taxa named by Michael Cota
Taxa named by Sunchai Makchai
Taxa named by Suttinee Lhaotaew